Throughout the existence of the G.I. Joe media franchise, there have been several video games released.

List of G.I. Joe Games

References

G.I. Joe